Jan Kobuszewski (born 6 May 1947) is a Polish former long jumper. He competed in Athletics at the 1972 Summer Olympics – Men's long jump.

References

1947 births
Living people
Polish male long jumpers
Athletes (track and field) at the 1972 Summer Olympics
Olympic athletes of Poland
People from Inowrocław
Sportspeople from Kuyavian-Pomeranian Voivodeship